The 2003 Tour de France was the 90th edition and centenary of the Tour de France, one of cycling's Grand Tours. The Tour began in Paris on 5 July with a prologue individual time trial and finished on the Champs-Élysées, back in Paris, on 27 July. The Tour started with 22 teams of 9 cyclists each.

Teams

Qualified teams

 
 
 
 
 
 
 
 
 
 
 
 
 
 

Invited teams

Cyclists

By starting number

By team
"DNF" indicates that a rider did not finish the race.

By nationality 
The 198 riders that are competing in the 2003 Tour de France originated from 26 different countries.

References

External links

Teams
2003